Nelson Rodríguez Serna (born 16 November 1965) is a Colombian former road bicycle racer. He won a stage in 1994 Tour de France. He also competed in the road race at the 1988 Summer Olympics. Rodríguez was born in Manizales, Caldas, Colombia.

Major results

1992
Vuelta al Tachira: winner stage 5
1993
Vuelta al Tachira: winner stage 6
1994
Tour de France:
Winner stage 17
Giro d'Italia:
6th place overall classification

References

External links

1965 births
Living people
People from Manizales
Colombian male cyclists
Colombian Tour de France stage winners
Cyclists at the 1988 Summer Olympics
Olympic cyclists of Colombia
20th-century Colombian people